J. C. Chestine "Rooster" Coffee (April 22, 1915 – September 14, 2000) was an American football coach and player. He served as the head football coach at Maryland State College (now known as the University of Maryland Eastern Shore) from 1946 to 1947. He led the 1947 Maryland State Raiders football team to a perfect 8–0 record. He played college football at Indiana University, earning All-Big Nine honors as a guard in 1943.

References

1915 births
2000 deaths
African-American players of American football
American football guards
Indiana Hoosiers football players
Maryland Eastern Shore Hawks football coaches
People from Henderson County, Kentucky
Players of American football from Kentucky
20th-century African-American sportspeople